Pisit Poodchalat (born 20 February 1992) is a Thai badminton player. He was the boys' singles gold medalist at the 2010 Summer Youth Olympics in Singapore. Poodchalat claimed the men's singles title at the 2012 National Championships beating Sitthikom Thammasin in straight games with the score 21–19, 21–15. He also competed at the 2013 Summer Universiade in Kazan, Russia, winning a bronze medal in the mixed team event.

Achievements

Youth Olympic Games 
Boys' singles

Asian Junior Championships 
Mixed doubles

BWF International Challenge/Series 
Men's singles

Mixed doubles

  BWF International Challenge tournament
  BWF International Series tournament
  BWF Future Series tournament

References

External links 
 

Living people
1992 births
Pisit Poodchalat
Badminton players at the 2010 Summer Youth Olympics
Competitors at the 2011 Southeast Asian Games
Pisit Poodchalat
Southeast Asian Games medalists in badminton
Universiade bronze medalists for Thailand
Universiade medalists in badminton
Youth Olympic gold medalists for Thailand
Medalists at the 2013 Summer Universiade
Pisit Poodchalat